Larch Network, Ltd. (previously Niram Systems) is company specializing in the design and development of hardware and software for embedded network systems, including network switches and routers, thin client systems and Linux gateways.

Products and services 
Larch Network is an exclusive developer of Ethernet switching solutions for selected Marvell customers.

L2/L3 Switches
Larch Networks products come with complete reference designs which include board layout designs, software, manufacturing diagnostic tools, documentation, and other items to assist customers with product evaluation and production.

Thin client / Plug PC
An Open Source Green Server for the Always-On Lifestyle

OpenFlow Switch
The Extendible Linux-based OpenFlow LN-2124OF switch based on Marvell 98DX4122 Packet-Processors and contains the implementation of hardware-based OpenFlow protocol 1.0 standard in OpenFlow-Only mode.

The benefits of this product are:
 An introduction of new and utilization of existent hardware capabilities of Marvell Packet-Processors
 Acceleration of the development of new features per a customer’s demand
 Easy-to-use SDK platform for Marvell’s Packet-Processors product line
 Providing universities (professors and students) the powerful platform for study and academic researches.

The underlying hardware is capable of many functions not supported by OpenFlow v1.0 including:
 Multiple Lookup cycles
 Extensible Matching
 Tunneling QoS and Security
 Full VLAN support
 Bandwidth allocation and policing, etc.

The user can modify and extend the software functionality to utilize additional Hardware functionality not yet in use, implement a substantial subset of OpenFlow v1.3, or add additional application level functionality. In addition, LN2124OF Switch provides unique DualBoot system, that allows coexistence of two different OS in one switch – Linux Based open-source Operation System, and fully managed stacking Ethernet Switch based on Marvell's Routing Operation System (ROS), that contains full features set of Layer2 and Layer3 protocols and is the manufacturing default.

See also 

 Marvell
 Open Networking Foundation

References

External links 

 

Software companies of Israel